The SunTrust Plaza is a 13-story building located next to the Ryman Auditorium in Nashville, Tennessee. The building was completed in 2007 and features a Panera Bread restaurant and a fitness center.

See also
List of tallest buildings in Nashville

References

External links
 Emporis Listing

Skyscrapers in Nashville, Tennessee
Skyscraper office buildings in Tennessee
Office buildings completed in 2007
SunTrust Banks